Joom is an international group of e-commerce and fintech companies founded in June 2016 in Riga, Latvia. It also has offices in China, Hong Kong, the United States, Germany, and Luxembourg. Joom currently includes five different businesses.

Overview

Joom Marketplace 
Joom Marketplace is an e-commerce platform and mobile app that sells products from Asia and Europe. It was launched in 2016 in Riga, Latvia.

Joom’s app was launched in France, Spain, Germany in 2017. Joom was the most downloaded shopping app in Europe for 2018 with more than 56 million installs.

By the end of 2020, the app Joom has been downloaded 150 million times in the European region.

In 2021, Joom joined the Product Safety Pledge initiative, which is an agreement to cooperate with the EU Member States to remove dangerous products from its websites.

As of the beginning of 2022, Joom had over 400 million users worldwide across iOS, Android, and the Web. The marketplace had 25 million monthly active users and 20 million active buyers.

Joom became one of the first platforms that resumed the delivery of goods to Ukraine after the beginning of the Russian invasion of Ukraine.

Since 2022, Joom has been supporting Latvian the Atis Kronvalds Foundation’s “Talent Development Ranking”.

Joom Logistics 
Joom Logistics is a service that provides logistics, technology and infrastructure services for cross-border e-сommerce. It was launched in 2018.

In 2021, it launched logistics services in Europe and South Korea, along with hubs in China and Turkey (it appeared on the Turkish market in June 2019).

Joompay 
In 2019, Joom founded Joompay, a fintech service for daily financial transactions in Europe. Joompay obtained its license in November 2020 in Luxembourg, where the company is based. In 2021, Joompay officially launched an EU payment mobile app. 

In December 2020, Joompay became a Principal Member of the Visa card scheme. The service is regulated by the Commission de Surveillance du Secteur Financier.  Most of the service's clients are located in France, Spain and Germany.

In March 2021, Joompay started cooperation with the verification provider Veriff.

In 2022, the number of service users reached 250,000. In the same year, the service began cooperation with the Banking Circle payment bank.

JoomPro 
In 2021, Joom launched JoomPro, a platform for cross-border wholesale trade. It lets merchants conclude an agreement in which cost and delivery time are prescribed beforehand, and also provides a “one window” mode - the work with the client is always carried out by one manager who works with the importer at all stages of delivery. JoomPro features over 100 thousand products as of 2021 from dozens of Chinese vendors in categories such as electronics, clothing, household goods and others. JoomPro plans to raise the number of product items to several million entities.

JoomPro works on a "turnkey" basis, that is, it handles the order processing from the supplier, control of the quality, storage at a warehouse in China, logistics for shipping to Europe, customs clearance, certification and declaration, etc. JoomPro also plans to increase its assortment and establish direct contacts with factories and manufacturers in China.

Onfy 
Onfy is a pharmaceutical marketplace available for customers in Germany. It was registered in 2021 as Joom Pharm Solutions GmbH and launched in 2022 as Onfy. Onfy’s headquarters are located in Berlin.

References

External links
 
 
 
 
 

2016 establishments in Latvia
E-commerce
Latvian websites